Mumbai City Football Club is an Indian professional football club based in Mumbai, Maharashtra that competes in Indian Super League, the top-tier league of Indian football. The club was founded on 30 August 2014 during the inaugural season of Indian  Super League. Former England international Peter Reid managed the club during the first season with Freddie Ljungberg being the marquee player.

List of Players
As of 31 December 2020.

The list includes all the players registered under a Mumbai City FC contract. Some players might not have featured in a professional game for the club.

References 

Lists of association football players by club in India
Mumbai City FC players
Association football player non-biographical articles